Henry Jermyn, 3rd Baron Jermyn and 1st Baron Dover, 1st Jacobite Earl of Dover PC (c. 1636–1708) was an English peer and supporter of James II.

Jermyn was the second son of Thomas Jermyn, of Rushbrooke, Suffolk, who died in 1659, and his wife Rebecca Rodway, who married secondly Henry Brouncker, 3rd Viscount Brouncker. He surpassed his uncle, Lord St Albans, in reputation for profligacy, figuring frequently as "the little Jermyn" in the Grammont Memoirs, as the lover of Lady Castlemaine, Lady Shrewsbury, Miss Jennings and other beauties of the court of Charles II of England.

According to rumour, his most notable conquest was Charles's widowed sister Mary of Orange, whom he met several times during her brother's exile, and there were even stories that they were secretly married. Historians generally discount these rumours, but Charles II took them seriously, and reprimanded his sister for her lack of discretion, but with no effect: Mary sharply reminded her brother that his own love affairs hardly entitled him to judge her moral conduct. Charles was especially angry because of the similar rumours that Jermyn's uncle Lord St Albans had secretly married the Queen Dowager Henrietta Maria. As John Phillipps Kenyon remarked, to have one Jermyn as an in-law would have been bad enough; to have two would be intolerable.

He was a noted duelist and a lifelong gambler. In a notorious duel with Colonel Thomas Howard, (younger brother of Charles Howard, 1st Earl of Carlisle), in August 1662, which Samuel Pepys refers to in his Diary, Jermyn was left for dead. He recovered, but his second Giles Rawlings was killed by Howard's second Colonel Carey Dillon, later the 5th Earl of Roscommon: the cause is said to have been the rivalry between Jermyn and Howard for the affections of Lady Shrewsbury, who was notorious for the number of her lovers.

While the court was in exile, he obtained a post in the household of the Duke of York, despite the strong disapproval of Charles II, and he became James's  master of the horse at the English Restoration, and rode a horse at the Coronation of Charles II. Having previously offended the king by courting his sister  Mary, he proceeded to give further offence by having an affair with Lady Castlemaine, by then the chief royal mistress, and he was banished from court for six months.

Being a Roman Catholic, he enjoyed a position of influence with James, who on his accession raised Jermyn to the Peerage of England in 1685 as Baron Dover in the county of Kent, and appointed him Lieutenant-General of the Royal Guard in 1686. He was one of the first Catholics to be admitted to the Privy Council of England. Despite his debauched private life, as a politician, he was a  moderate and sensible influence on the king. While his loyalty was never in question, he was not afraid to speak his mind to James, or to disagree with him in public.

At the Glorious Revolution, Dover adhered to James, whom he followed abroad, and in July 1689 the deposed sovereign created him Baron Jermyn of Royston, Baron Ipswich, Viscount Cheveley and Earl of Dover in the Jacobite Peerage, these titles not being recognised by the English Government, though Dover became generally known as the Earl of Dover. He commanded a troop at the Battle of the Boyne, but shortly afterwards made his submission to King William III. He spent the rest of his life living quietly at his London townhouse, or at his country estate Cheveley, near Newmarket. He succeeded his brother Thomas as 3rd Baron Jermyn in 1703, and died in 1708. As he left no children by his wife, Judith, daughter of Sir Edmund Poley, of Badley, Suffolk, his titles became extinct at his death. His estates were inherited by his niece, Hon. Merolina Jermyn, wife of Sir Thomas Spring, 3rd Baronet.

References

|-

1630s births
1708 deaths
Dover, Henry Jermyn, 1st Baron
3
Earls in the Jacobite peerage
Earls of Dover
English Jacobites
Lord-Lieutenants of Cambridgeshire
Jermyn
Members of the Privy Council of England
Peers created by James II (1689–1701)
People from Rushbrooke with Rougham
Henry